The occupation of Outer Mongolia by the Beiyang government of the Republic of China after the revocation of Outer Mongolian autonomy began in October 1919 and lasted until 18 March 1921, when Chinese troops in Urga were routed by Baron Roman von Ungern-Sternberg's White Russian (Buryats, Russians etc.) and Mongolian forces. These, in turn, were defeated by the Red Army and its Mongolian allies by June 1921.

Although the Beiyang government abolished the autonomy of the Bogd Khanate of Mongolia in Outer Mongolia and then expanded its occupation to include Uryankhay Krai (Tuva), it was unable to consolidate its rule over both regions.

Background 
In December 1911 during the Xinhai Revolution, Outer Mongolia declared independence from the Qing dynasty in the Mongolian Revolution of 1911. Mongolia became a de facto absolute theocratic monarchy led by the Bogd Khan. However, the newly established Republic of China claimed inheritance of all territories held by the Qing dynasty and considered Outer Mongolia as part of its territory. This claim was provided for in the Imperial Edict of the Abdication of the Qing Emperor signed by the Empress Dowager Longyu on behalf of the six-year-old Xuantong Emperor: "[...] the continued territorial integrity of the lands of the five races, Manchu, Han, Mongol, Hui, and Tibetan into one great Republic of China" ([...] ). The Provisional Constitution of the Republic of China adopted in 1912 specifically established frontier regions of the new republic, including Outer Mongolia, as integral parts of the state.

In the 1915 tripartite Kyakhta Agreement, the Russian Empire (which had strategic interests in Mongolian independence but did not want to completely alienate China), the Republic of China and the Bogd Khanate of Mongolia agreed that Outer Mongolia was autonomous under Chinese suzerainty. However, in the following years Russian influence in Asia waned due to the First World War and, later, the October Revolution. Since 1918, Outer Mongolia was threatened by the Russian Civil War, and in summer 1918 asked for Chinese military assistance, which led to the deployment of a small force to Urga. Grigory Semyonov led the Buryats and Inner Mongols in spearheading a plan to create a pan-Mongol state. Meanwhile, some Mongol aristocrats had become more and more dissatisfied with their marginalization at the hands of the theocratic Lamaist government, and, also provoked by the threat of the Outer Mongolia's independence from the pan-Mongolist movement of Grigory Semyonov in Siberia, were ready to accept Chinese rule by 1919. According to an Associated Press dispatch, some Mongol chieftains signed a petition asking China to retake administration of Mongolia and end Outer Mongolia's autonomy. Since they opposed the Bogd Khan and his clerics, Mongol nobles agreed to abolish Mongol autonomy and reunite with China under an agreement with 63 stipulations signed with Chen Yi in August–September 1919. The pan-Mongolist initiative of Grigory Semyonov led by Buryats and Inner Mongols was rejected by the Khalkha Mongol nobles of Urga, so the Khalkha nobles instead assured the Chinese under Chen Yi that they were against it. The prospect of ending Mongol autonomy and having Chinese troops stationed in Niialel Khuree, Altanbulag, Uliyasutai, and Khovd was permitted by the Mongolian government in response to the Japanese-backed Buryatia pan-Mongol movement.

An ally of the Chinese government, the Qinghai-born Monguor Gelugpa Buddhist Lama leader Sixth Janggiya Khutughtu was against the autonomy of Outer Mongolia.

Causes 

The invasion of Mongolia was the brainchild of Chinese Prime Minister Duan Qirui, who engineered China's entry into World War I. He took out several large loans from the Japanese government, including the Nishihara Loans. He used the money to create the War Participation Army, ostensibly to battle the Central Powers. His rivals knew that the purpose of the army was really to crush internal dissent. It existed outside the Ministry of the Army and was controlled by the War Participation Bureau, which he led, and it was staffed entirely by his Anhui clique. President Feng Guozhang, Duan's rival, had no control, despite constitutionally being commander-in-chief. When the war ended without a soldier stepping foot abroad, his critics demanded the disbanding of the War Participation Army. Duan had to find a new purpose for his army. Mongolia was chosen for several reasons:
 Duan's envoys to the 1919 Paris Peace Conference were unable to prevent the German concession in Shandong (Kiautschou Bay Leased Territory) being transferred to Japan, which caused the Chinese nationalist May Fourth Movement to target his policies. His reputation as a patriot was discredited. Reintegrating Mongolia would reverse the situation.
 The Constitutional Protection War was fought to a bloody standstill in Hunan. Using his army for another risky attempt to retake southern China from the rebels was undesirable.
 The Russian Civil War left Mongolia without a foreign protector. An easy victory would boost Duan's stature.
 The longstanding Prime Minister of Mongolia, Tögs-Ochiryn Namnansüren, died in April 1919 and left the country's ruling elite deeply divided over a successor. Some of Mongolia's princes, as well as its Han Chinese, sought reunification with China.

Invasion 

The pro-Japanese Anhui clique leader Xu Shuzheng led the military occupation of Mongolia in violation of Chen Yi's agreement signed with the Mongol nobles because he wanted to use Mongolia as his own fief. Anhui clique was also known as Anfu group. The Anfu Club was bribed by Japan to implement in Mongolia the strategies of Japan.

The War Participation Army was renamed the Northwestern Frontier Army. Duan gave control of it to his right-hand man, Xu Shuzheng, a member of the pro-Japanese Anhui clique in the Chinese government. They announced that the expedition was at the invitation of several Mongolian princes to protect Mongolia from Bolshevik incursions. It was supposed to begin in July 1919, but the train broke down. In October, Xu led a spearhead group of 4,000 that quickly captured Urga without resistance. Another 10,000 troops followed to occupy the rest of the country. The successful invasion was met with acclaim throughout China, even by Sun Yat-sen's rival southern government, although Sun's telegram could be interpreted sarcastically. The Japanese were the ones who ordered the pro Japanese Chinese warlords to occupy Mongolia to halt a possibly-revolutionary spillover from the Russian revolutionaries into Mongolia and Northern China. After the Chinese had completed the occupation, the Japanese abandoned them and left them on their own. Manlaibaatar Damdinsüren said, "I can defend Mongolia from China and Red Russia."

 

 
In 1919, the Mongolian Council of Khans was addressed to by Xu Shuzheng in a condescending speech. In February 1920, Xu presided over a very humiliating ceremony in which Bogd Khan and other leaders were forced to kowtow before him and the Five Races Under One Union flag. That event marked the beginning of active resistance against Chinese rule, which coalesced into the Mongolian People's Party.

Domestic politics in China soon changed the situation dramatically. The invasion had caused alarm for Zhang Zuolin, the powerful warlord of Manchuria, who was upset that such a large army was moved so close to his territory. He joined the chorus of critics such as Cao Kun and Wu Peifu calling for the removal of the Anhui clique. In July, they forced President Xu Shichang to remove Xu Shuzheng from his position. In response, Xu Shuzheng moved the bulk of his forces to confront his enemies in China. Both he and Duan Qirui were defeated in the ensuing Zhili–Anhui War. That left only a few Chinese troops in Mongolia without their leadership.

Many of the Chinese troops during the occupation were Tsahar (Chahar) Mongols from Inner Mongolia, which was a major cause for animosity between Outer Mongols (Khalkhas) and Inner Mongols.

The Tüsheet Khan Aimag's Prince, Darchin Ch'in Wang, was a supporter of Chinese rule, but his younger brother Tsewang was a supporter of Ungern.

The Chinese sent a honghuzi-led band of Chahar Inner Mongols to fight against the Outer Mongols, but the Tushegoun Lama killed them. Both the Chinese army and Ungern's force contained Chahar Inner Mongol soldiers, who participating in kidnapping local Outer Mongol women in addition to looting and mutilating the Outer Mongols. The plundering Inner Mongol Chahars were recruited by the Chinese High Commissioner Wu Tsin Lao with the deliberate knowledge that they would engage in looting. Deserters, including Russians, from Ungern's forces were punished or killed by the Chahar Inner Mongols in Ungern's army. The Soviet Red Army crushed the Chahar Mongol unit of Ungern's forces.

In October, the White Russian Baron Roman von Ungern-Sternberg swept into Mongolia from the north, fought many battles against the Chinese garrison stationed in Urga, and captured it in February 1921. There, he defeated the Chinese forces and restored Bogd Khan as monarch. Around the same time, the MPP engaged in its first battle against Chinese troops. After the defeat of the Chinese army, 2000 Chinese petitioned the Living Buddha to enlist in his legions. They were accepted and formed into two regiments, which wore as insignia the old Chinese silver dragons.

The reconquest of Outer Mongolia was assigned to Zhang Zuolin. A joint MPP-Red Army expedition led by Soviet Red commanders and Damdin Sükhbaatar defeatedUngern in August. The Soviet forces against Ungern were led by Konstantin Konstantinovich Rokossovsky. Tensions leading up to the First Zhili–Fengtian War and the apparent victory of the Bolsheviks in the Russian Civil War led to the end of China's involvement. Reincarnations, abbots and lamas were imprisoned or executed by the Soviets. China rejected the Soviet intervention.

The Transbaikalia Cossack Ataman was Semyonov. A Mongol–Buryat republic was declared in January 1919 by Semyonov. A "Buryat National Department" was created by Semyonov and the Buryat elite like intelligentsia, lamas and noyons and summoned by Semyonov and the Japanese in February 1919. The aim was to unite Buryatia, Tuva, Outer Mongolia, and Inner Mongolia into one Mongol state, discussed at the February 1919 Chita "Pan-Mongol" congress led by the Japanese and Semyonov's Transbaikal Buryats. A "Provisional Government" was set up after the February 1919 meeting. Russian officered Chahars and Honghuzi served in Semyonov 's army. Chahars made up a division. There were Chahars, Tungus, Buryats, Tatars, Bashkirs, and others in the army. The Chahar Inner Mongols numbered around 2,000 and were placed in the "Wild Division" of OMO, led by General Levitskii. The White Army cavalry of Semyonov drafted 1,800 Buryats while Buryats were also recruited by the Bolsheviks. In Trans-Baikalia, Semyonov was joined by Kappel, who commanded Aleksandr Vasil'evich Kolchak's rearguard. Semyonov and Kolchak were allied. From 1916 to 1919, the Buryats were subjected to Japanese propaganda. The Paris Peace Conference was attended by representatives from the "Dauria Government" of the pan-Mongol initiative established in February 1919 by Semyonov. Since the Versatile Peace Conference of 1919 did not recognize the Daurija government of Semyonov, the Japanese withdrew their support of him. A machine gunning of 350 captives from a train was arranged in August 1919 by Semyonov. At Chita, a meeting between an American captain and Semyonov was canceled in December 1919.

Fushenge led the Bargut and Karachen (Karachin) Mongol soldiers and entrusted the training of them to Ungern. The Pan Mongolist Inner Mongolian Prince Fushenge was participating in the Pan-Mongol conference with Ungern when they sent representatives to Versailles, but Ungern developed a distaste for the idea of the pan-Mongol state, and no Outer Mongol bothered to attend the conference. The Bogd Khan rejected the idea of a pan-Mongol state since he did not want to lose his power to the Japanese and Semenov. Since did not want to provoke China, he rejected a delegation from Dauria in which Fushenge participated. Ungern's Russian officers in Dauria were drilling the Inner Mongol soldiers of Fushenge and Buriat soldiers, but hostility was developing between the Inner Mongols and the Buriats. After being assigned to attack Urga, Mongol soldiers of General Fussenge refused to participate. In response, the Japanese and OMO massacred them all.

Results 

After a brief period of constitutional monarchy, the Mongolian People's Republic was established in 1924 and would last until 1992.

The Chinese Army and the Soviet Red Army defeated the rest of the White Russians like Kazagrandi and Suharev as they fled and abandoned Ungern. The Chinese Army in June 1921 defeated a 350 strong White Russian unit, led by Colonel Kazagrandi, most of whom died in battle although 42 became prisoners.

It was proposed for Zhang Zuoling's domain (the Chinese "Three Eastern Provinces") to take Outer Mongolia under its administration by the Bogda Khan and Bodo in 1922 after pro-Soviet Mongolian Communists seized control of Outer Mongolia.

For China, the occupation indirectly led to the permanent breakup of the Beiyang Army and the fall of strongman Duan Qirui. That marked the period of high warlordism, as the former officers of Yuan Shikai battled one another for many years to come. Many White Russian guerrillas became mercenaries in China after the occupation. Along with the Siberian Intervention, that was the only foreign military expedition carried out by the Beiyang government. The Republic of China government continued to claim Mongolia as part of its territory until 1946, after the 1945 Mongolian independence referendum which voted for independence, but retracted its recognition of Mongolian independence in 1953 over Soviet assistance of the Communists in the Chinese Civil War.

In 2002, the Republic of China announced that it now recognized Mongolia as an independent country, excluding Mongolia from the official maps of the Republic of China and requiring Mongolian citizens visiting Taiwan to produce passports. Informal relations were established between Mongolia and Taiwan via trade offices in Ulan Bator and Taipei but without formal diplomatic recognition. The One-China policy makes Mongolia recognize only the People's Republic of China. No legislative actions were taken to address concerns over the Republic of China's constitutional claims to Mongolia, as amending the Constitution of the Republic of China is a politically-sensitive issue with the political status of Taiwan.

Buryats served in Ungern's army since Russians abused the Buryats, which made Stalin. During Stalin's persecutions, Mongolia became a refuge for fleeing Buryats. The Soviets used tactics to divided the Mongols away from the Tuvans and the Buryats. Soviet media launched an anti-Buddhist campaign in Buryatia. Mongol nationalism in Transbaikalia and Buryatia was equated with Grigorii Semenov by the Mongolian communists and the Soviets. The Soviets faced opposition in their anti-religious campaign from Buryat clerics. The Buryat-Mongolia Communist Party First Secretary Verbanov was executed in Stalin's purge. A Russian president now rules Buryatia, and Russians make up most of Buryatia's population because massive Buryat deaths had occurred during Russian rule, and Russians settled Buryatia.

See also 

 Bogd Khanate of Mongolia
 State of Buryat-Mongolia
 Mongolian Revolution of 1921
 Soviet intervention in Mongolia

References

Citations

Sources 

 Hsi-sheng Chi (1976). The Warlord Politics in China, 1916–1928. Stanford: Stanford University Press. 

20th century in Mongolia
Warlord Era
Military occupation
China–Soviet Union relations
China–Mongolia relations
1919 in Mongolia
1920 in Mongolia
1921 in Mongolia
Mongolia–Soviet Union relations